Brandling is a surname of English origin. People with that name include:
 Brandling of Newcastle, an English family of politicians, merchants, and land and coal owners
 Sir Francis Brandling (15951641), English landowner and politician
 Robert Brandling (15751636), English landowner and politician

See also 
 Eisenia fetida, a species of earthworm, one of whose common names is brandling